Conus visagenus, common name the Lemonsnap cone, is a species of sea snail, a marine gastropod mollusk in the family Conidae, the cone snails and their allies.

Like all species within the genus Conus, these snails are predatory and venomous. They are capable of "stinging" humans, therefore live ones should be handled carefully or not at all.

Description
The size of the shell varies between 17 mm and 32 mm.

Distribution
This marine species occurs off South Africa.

References

 Kilburn (1974), Durban Mus. Novit. 10 (6): p. 81, pl. 1, figs 1–4
 Kilburn, R.N. & Rippey, E. (1982) Sea Shells of Southern Africa. Macmillan South Africa, Johannesburg, xi + 249 pp.

External links
 The Conus Biodiversity website
Cone Shells – Knights of the Sea

visagenus
Gastropods described in 1974